CityPlace at Buckhead was an approved residential complex that planned to include eight 493 ft (150m), tall, 42 floor, skyscrapers and a 27 floor, 353 ft (108m) tall building, in Atlanta, Georgia, United States. It was approved July 27, 2006, and was being designed by Arquitectonica.

In October 2009 the property was foreclosed on and returned to the lender, Wells Fargo Bank. As of April 2011 the property was back up for sale.

See also 
 List of tallest buildings in Atlanta

References

Further reading
Ramos, Rachel T. "The city that was never built." The Atlanta Journal Constitution. Accessed November 2011.
Schoolcraft, Lisa R. (March 10, 2006). "3,800 new condos planned for Buckhead." Atlanta Business Chronicle. Accessed November 2011.

External links
 Emporis

Skyscrapers in Atlanta
Unbuilt buildings and structures in the United States